This is a list of players who have played at least one senior game in the Australian Football League (AFL), previously known as the Victorian Football League (VFL), who were born outside Australia.

List
Current AFL-listed players in bold.

See also
 VFL/AFL players with international backgrounds
 Australian rules football around the world

References 

Overseas
 List 
Employment of foreign-born